Rok Sako To Rok Lo is a 2004 Indian sports drama film produced and directed by Arindam Chaudhuri, in his debut. The film stars Sunny Deol, Yash Pandit and Manjari Fadnis. The music was scored by Jatin–Lalit.

Plot 
There are two neighbouring high schools – Bharti School, for the middle-class and Valley High School, for the affluent. Dev, Suhana, and their friends come from Bharti, and are often disturbed by their enemies who come from Valley High. The Valley High students also defeat the Bharti students in every single inter-school event that happens every year, which is the main reason why they make fun of Bharti. One day however, the Bharti students are saved from the Valley High students by a mysterious man Kabir Mukherjee, who they initially feared because of his rough looks, thereby the reason they always called him "Phantom". The Bharti students get close to Kabir and befriend him, and with time he also becomes more gentle and normal, thereby getting rid of his "Phantom" look.

Dev, however gets attached to Sanjana (Aparna Kumar), a girl from Valley High, which results in him dropping Suhana. But Sanjana eventually rejects him because he once insulted her at a café and because he belongs to the rival school. One day while driving in an open road, Dev and his friends are again insulted and considered "slow"  by the Valley High students who are also driving on the same road. Dev drives faster and overtakes them, but the car quickly meets with an accident and crashes. Everyone in the car survives, except Kabir, who died while saving the young guys. This leaves the Bharti students dismayed and defenceless against the Valley High students, with whom they have an upcoming 100 metres race competition. Dev however is still determined, so he trains up and attends the race with full confidence. During the race, he gets injured by one of the runners, but does not lose hope and through last-minute strength, he eventually wins the race, thereby finally letting Bharti get their revenge on Valley High. Incidentally the prize for the winner is a bike similar to Kabir's, so Dev becomes the new "Phantom".

Cast 
 Sunny Deol as Kabir "Phantom" Mukherjee
 Yash Pandit as Dev
 Manjari Fadnis as Suhana
 Namrata Shirodkar as Sandra / Narrator
 Carran Kapur as Ranveer Pratap Singh
 Aparna Kumar as Sanjana
 Deepti Bhatnagar as Dev's Bhabhi
 Archana Puran Singh as Sweety
 Tinnu Anand as S.V.P.S, Balasubramaniam Iyer
 Rakesh Bedi as Ghodbole
 Rajit Kapoor as Sweety's husband
 Tiku Talsania as Sweety's husband
 Aanjjan Srivastav as Ganguly

Production 
Rok Sako To Rok Lo was the directorial debut for Arindam Chaudhuri. According to him, "The central theme is friendship". He also mentioned that it would show how "the principal of management can help reduce wastage of money in the film industry." The film was one out of 50 different stories which he worked on. The cast had mostly teenage debutants, while established actors like Tikku Talsania, Archana Puransingh, Anjan Srivastva, Rakesh Bedi, Tinu Anand and Rajit Kapoor played supporting roles. To choose a title for the film, Chaudhuri conducted "market research".

Soundtrack 
The film's musical score was composed by Jatin–Lalit, while the lyrics were written by Prasoon Joshi.

Reception 
Patcy N of Rediff.com said, "Manjari has performed well, but Yash looks nervous in some scenes", and further wrote "I would recommend renting a Jo Jeeta Wohi Sikander DVD instead of spending money to watch this film." Subhash K. Jha rated the film 2/5 and said, "Sadly, the film's basic tenor is too flighty to hold up such lofty ideas. Thoughts that go beyond eye candy entertainment float in and out of the narrative without getting a chance to lodge themselves in the plot."

References

External links 
 

2004 films
2000s Hindi-language films
Indian sports drama films
Films scored by Jatin–Lalit